Gordon John Graydon  (born September 19, 1942) is a Canadian politician and former member of the Legislative Assembly of Alberta. He represented the electoral district of Grande Prairie-Wapiti as a Progressive Conservative from the 2001 election until the 2008 election, in which he did not seek re-election. He was Alberta's last Gaming Minister.

References

Progressive Conservative Association of Alberta MLAs
Living people
Members of the Executive Council of Alberta
1942 births
21st-century Canadian politicians